Josephine Webb (born June 21, 1918) is an American electrical engineer who obtained two patents for oil circuit breaker contact design, known colloquially as "switchgear". She designed an eighteen-inch, full newspaper size fax machine with superior resolution. She co-founded Webb Consulting Company with her husband, also an electrical engineer. She is one of the first female electrical engineers, and considered a pioneer by the Society of Women Engineers. At Purdue University, she was one out of a total of five women engineers. She turned 100 in June 2018.

Early life

Webb was born Josephine Rohas in Niagara Falls, New York. She grew up in a one-parent household in Buffalo; her father served in World War I and never returned home. Her brother, Roderick, was two-and-a-half years older. Webb considered him a great influence in her early life, and by causality, her later life. When Roderick became interested in radio, they both became ham radio operators. He helped her get her license. She joined the ham radio club at Kenmore High School. At thirteen years old, Josephine was the youngest YL operator.

As a child, Webb loved aviation and often visited the local airport. She was good at math and joined her high school's science club. She had always been fascinated by technical subjects. She graduated Kenmore High School in 1934. She worked for two years before attending Purdue University.

Education

Webb's brother urged her to apply to an out-of-state scholarship. She majored in electrical engineering and graduated from Purdue University in 1940. She became a Buhl Research Fellow in the Electrical Engineering Department of the Carnegie Institute of Technology for two years. She was a member of Sigma Xi.

Personal life

Webb has two daughters, one was born in 1948 and the other 1952. The family had a laboratory, which was also set up as a measurements laboratory, as an addition to their home.

Career
In 1942, she joined Westinghouse Electric Corporation as a Design Engineer, where among other duties, she worked on the electrical grids for the Coulee, Hoover, and Boulder Dams. It was during her tenure with the company that she obtained two patents for oil circuit breaker contact design.

In 1946, Webb became Director of Development for the Facsimile Development Laboratory at the Alden Products Company where she designed an eighteen-inch, full newspaper size fax machine with exceptional resolution for that time. Later, Webb co-founded the Webb Consulting Company with her husband, Herbert Webb. They specialized in electrical-electronic measurement instrumentation, communications applications, and photographic test devices. They worked for clients as diverse as Boeing and the U.S. Bureau of Mines.

In addition to the consulting business, Webb also took a position in 1977 with North Idaho College where she began development of a Computer Center and worked on several government grants for enhancing the campus and its educational programs.

Webb holds four patents for her innovative work and has been active in many professional organizations including IEEE, NSPE, and SWE where she holds Fellows status.

See also
 Society of Women Engineers
 Institute of Electrical and Electronics Engineers
 National Society of Professional Engineers

References

1918 births
Living people
American centenarians
American electrical engineers
20th-century American inventors
21st-century American inventors
American women engineers
Purdue University College of Engineering alumni
People from Buffalo, New York
People from Niagara Falls, New York
Engineers from New York (state)
21st-century women engineers
Women inventors
Women centenarians
21st-century American women